William Arthur Schröpfer (17 March 1908 – 25 February 1962) known by the pen name and stage name Arthur Macrae was an English playwright and comic actor. He graduated from RADA in 1928; with acting work including the original West End productions of Noël Coward's Cavalcade (1931), and South Sea Bubble (1956). He wrote the book for the 1945 hit West End musical Under the Counter.

Selected written works
Flat to Let - play (1931), produced at the Criterion Theatre with Lilian Braithwaite and Ann Todd
She Shall Have Music - film (1935)
Under Your Hat - musical play (1939) (filmed in 1940)
Traveller's Joy - play (1948) (filmed in 1949)
Encore - film (1951) segment "Winter Cruise" 
Both Ends Meet - play (1954) also filmed by the BBC for the Sunday-Night Play (1960–1963) aired 25 March 1962.

References

External links
 
 

1908 births
1962 deaths
20th-century British dramatists and playwrights
Alumni of RADA
English male stage actors
English male film actors